Bohdanivka is a village in Alchevsk Raion (district) in Luhansk Oblast of eastern Ukraine, at about 45 km WbN from the centre of Luhansk city.

The ancestors of the ethnic Russians in the village were transplanted there during the 17th-century, to build a fortified outpost against the Khanate of Crimea.

The settlement was taken under control of pro-Russian forces during the War in Donbass, that started in 2014. It is administered as a part of the de facto Luhansk People's Republic.

People
 Fr. Potapy Emelianov (c. 1889-1936), local Old Ritualist priest of the Russian Greek Catholic Church and martyr in the Gulag. Under investigation since 2003 for possible Roman Catholic Sainthood.

References

Old Believer communities

Villages in Alchevsk Raion